
West Vienna United Methodist Church was a historic church located at 5461 Wilson Road in Clio, Michigan, USA. It was listed on the National Register of Historic Places in 1983 and has apparently been demolished.

History
The church congregation originally met in the West Vienna School House. They formed the  West Vienna Cemetery Association in 1880 and, soon after, decided to build a church nearby. The new building was constructed and a dedication was held on October 12, 1882.

The township of Vienna later took over the cemetery. In 1978, a new church was built near the 1882 structure. The congregation still use this building. The new West Vienna United Methodist Church is located at 5485 Wilson Road. Presumably, the earlier building was demolished.

Description
The West Vienna United Methodist Church was a rectangular gable end Greek Revival structure, three bays wide. It had a double door in the front facade, framed with classically detailed pilasters and a full entablature. A wide frieze ran around the top of the structure, and a square belfry was on top of the roof. The windows had stained glass panes.

References

External links

Methodist churches in Michigan
Churches on the National Register of Historic Places in Michigan
Greek Revival church buildings in Michigan
Churches completed in 1882
Buildings and structures in Genesee County, Michigan
National Register of Historic Places in Genesee County, Michigan
1882 establishments in Michigan
Wooden churches in Michigan